Nucleolaria granulata, common name the granulated cowry, is a species of sea snail, a cowry, a marine gastropod mollusk in the family Cypraeidae, the cowries.

Description
The shape of the shells is wide oval and appears flattened. The dorsum surface is rough, with a deep longitudinal line in the middle and many protuberances of various sizes, each other connected by thin ribs. The aperture is narrow and the outer and inner lips have fine teeth. The base is wide and the teeth are extended to cross the entire base as ribs on both sides. In the living cowries the mantle is pinkish or reddish, with well-developed papillae, which serve to camouflage these mollusks against the seabed.

Distribution
This species is endemic to the Hawaii and Marquesas Islands.

Habitat

References
 Felix Lorenz and Alex Hubert : A Guide to Worldwide Cowries, second revised edition, Conch Books, 2002

External links
 Biolib
 
 N. granulata

Cypraeidae
Gastropods described in 1862